The Centenario Bridge (Spanish: Puente del Centenario) is a cable-stayed bridge in Seville, Spain. It crosses over the left branch of Guadalquivir.

History and description 
Programmed as part of the infrastructures for the Expo '92, building works took place from 1989 to 1991. Part of the  ring-road, it displays a total length of 565 m, with a main span of 265 m and a maximum height of 102 m. It crosses the river near the Batán harbour of the Port of Seville. The 5 spans are as follows: (48 – 102 – 265 – 102 – 48) m. The bridge has 88 strap cables.

The bridge opened on 15 November 1991. Only featuring 2 lanes of motor vehicles on each side, it soon became a bottleneck.

References
Citations

Bibliography
 

Bridges in Seville
Cable-stayed bridges in Spain
Road bridges in Spain
Bridges over the Guadalquivir River
Bridges completed in 1991